América Football Club may refer to:

Brazil 
 América Football Club (PR), Curitiba
 América Football Club (CE), Fortaleza
 America Football Club (Rio de Janeiro), Rio de Janeiro
 América Futebol Clube (AC), Rio Branco
 América Futebol Clube (AL), São Luís do Quitunde
 América Futebol Clube (AM), Manaus
 América Futebol Clube (Vitória), Vitória
 América Futebol Clube (GO), Morrinhos
 América Futebol Clube (MG), Belo Horizonte
 América Futebol Clube (Teófilo Otoni), Teófilo Otoni
 América Futebol Clube (Caaporã), Caaporã
 América Futebol Clube (Pernambuco), Paulista
 América Futebol Clube (Três Rios), Três Rios
 América Futebol Clube (RN), Natal
 América Futebol Clube (SE), Propriá
 América Futebol Clube (SC), Joinville
 América Futebol Clube (SP), São José do Rio Preto

Colombia 
 América de Cali

Ecuador 
América de Ambato, a former team of Ecuadorian Serie A
América de Manta
 América de Quito

Haiti 
 América des Cayes

Mexico 
 Club América, Mexico City

Nicaragua 
 América Managua

Venezuela 
 América F.C. (Venezuela)